The Bronze of Luzaga is a plate of 16 x 15 centimeters which has, in 8 lines, 123 celtiberian characters engraved in the metal with a bradawl or similar, and which has 7 holes, perhaps in order to be held. Since its discovery in the late nineteenth century, it has been lost.

Transcription 

aregoratikubos : karuo : genei

gortika : lutiakei : aukis : barazioka

erna : uela : tigerzetaz : so

ueizui : belaiokumkue

genis : garikokue : genis

sdam : gortikam : elazunom

karuo : tegez : sa : gortika

teiuoreikis

(Jordán 2004)

Further reading 

 Ferrer i Jané, Joan (2005): “Novetats sobre el sistema dual de diferenciació gràfica de les oclusives”, Palaeohispanica 5, pp. 957–982. 
 Jordán, Carlos (2005): “¿Sistema dual de escritura en celtibérico?”, Palaeohispanica 5, pp. 1013–1030. 
 Jordán, Carlos. (2004): Celtibérico, Zaragoza.
 Meid, Wolfgang. (1994). Celtiberian Inscriptions, Budapest.
 Untermann, Jürgen (1997): Monumenta Linguarum Hispanicarum. IV Die tartessischen, keltiberischen und lusitanischen Inschriften, Wiesbaden.

External links
Luzaga's history website

Archaeological artifacts
Archaeology of Spain
Celtiberian inscriptions